Resolution is Hidden in Plain View's second full-length album, released on July 24, 2007 through Drive-Thru Records. This album was released after the band had already broken up.

The album was produced by Brian McTernan.

Track listing 
 Bendy - 3:24
 I Don't Wanna Hear It - 2:51
 Like An Ocean - 2:58
 Heavy Breathing - 3:43
 Walk Harbor City - 3:48
 Circles - 3:55
 Our Time - 3:43
 Off My Shoulders - 4:24
 Interlude - 0:57
 Something Needs To Change - 4:13
 The Lake House - 3:58
 Hear Me Out - 4:11

2007 albums
Hidden in Plain View albums
Drive-Thru Records albums
Albums produced by Brian McTernan